Lulingu Tshionka Airport  is an airport serving the town of Lulingu in Sud-Kivu Province, Democratic Republic of the Congo.

See also

Transport in the Democratic Republic of the Congo
List of airports in the Democratic Republic of the Congo

References

External links
 Lulingu Tshionka
 HERE Maps - Lulingu Tshionka
 OpenStreetMap - Lulingu Tshionka
 OurAirports - Lulingu Tshionka

Airports in South Kivu